The 2006–07 FA Premier Reserve League season was the eighth season of the Premier Reserve League since its establishment. Reigning champions of the Northern Division Manchester United had won two consecutive Northern Premier Reserve League titles and three in total but were looking to become the first side ever to win three years in a row. Reigning champions of the Southern League Tottenham Hotspur were looking to match Derby County and Charlton Athletic by winning two Southern Reserve League titles in a row.

Both failed to meet their objectives, with Bolton Wanderers winning the Northern Division on the final day with a 3–1 home win against Newcastle United, and Reading winning the Southern Division after a 4–0 win away to West Ham United.

The Premier Reserve League Play-off Final to determine the overall winner was contested between the two champions – Bolton and Reading – at the Madejski Stadium, with Reading winning the game 2-0 and being crowned overall reserve champions.

Watford, Charlton and Sheffield United's relegation from the senior league meant that, despite their performances in the reserve league, all three teams were relegated from the Premier Reserve League and replaced by the promoted teams Birmingham, Derby County, and Sunderland for the 2007–08 season.

League table
Reserve League North

Reserve League South

Pld = Matches played; W = Matches won; D = Matches drawn; L = Matches lost; F = Goals for; A = Goals against; GD = Goal difference; Pts = Points

See also
2006–07 in English football
2006–07 FA Premier League

External links
Official Premier League site

Premier Reserve League
Premier Reserve League 2006-07
Reserve